Joseph Henry Collin VC (10 April 1893 – 9 April 1918) was an English recipient of the Victoria Cross, the highest and most prestigious award for gallantry in the face of the enemy that can be awarded to British and Commonwealth forces.

Collin was born on 10 April 1893 to Joseph Collin and Mary MacDermont, of 8 Petteril Terrace, Harraby, Carlisle. He was 24 years old, and a second lieutenant in the 1/4th Battalion, King's Own Royal Lancaster Regiment when he was awarded the VC for his actions on 9 April 1918 at Givenchy, France. He was killed in action whilst performing the act.

Citation

His Victoria Cross is displayed at the King's Own Royal Regiment Museum, Lancaster, England.

References

Monuments to Courage (David Harvey, 1999)
The Register of the Victoria Cross (This England, 1997)
VCs of the First World War - Spring Offensive 1918 (Gerald Gliddon, 1997)

External links
  King's Own Royal Regiment Museum
 

British World War I recipients of the Victoria Cross
British Army personnel of World War I
British military personnel killed in World War I
King's Own Royal Regiment soldiers
King's Own Royal Regiment officers
People from Jarrow
1893 births
1918 deaths
British Army recipients of the Victoria Cross
English military personnel
Burials in France